Jacqueline Jacob (also Jakob) is a retired German butterfly swimmer who won one gold and two silver medals at the 1989 European Aquatics Championships.

References

Living people
East German female swimmers
East German female butterfly swimmers
European Aquatics Championships medalists in swimming
Year of birth missing (living people)